BioNTech SE (or   short for Biopharmaceutical New Technologies) is a German biotechnology company based in Mainz that develops and manufactures active immunotherapies for patient-specific approaches to the treatment of diseases. It develops pharmaceutical candidates based on messenger ribonucleic acid (mRNA) for use as individualized cancer immunotherapies, as vaccines against infectious diseases and as protein replacement therapies for rare diseases, and also engineered cell therapy, novel antibodies and small molecule immunomodulators as treatment options for cancer.

The company has developed an mRNA-based human therapeutic for intravenous administration to bring individualized mRNA-based cancer immunotherapy to clinical trials and to establish its own manufacturing process.

In 2020, BioNTech, partnering with Pfizer for testing and logistics, developed the RNA vaccine BNT162b2 for preventing COVID-19 infections, which at the time offered a 91% efficacy in preventing confirmed COVID-19 occurring at least 7 days after the second dose of vaccine. On 2 December 2020, temporary HMR authorization was granted by the United Kingdom government for BNT162b2 vaccinations within the United Kingdom. It was the first mRNA vaccine ever authorized. Some days later the vaccine also received an emergency approval in the United States, Canada and Switzerland. On 21 December 2020, the European Commission approved BioNTech/Pfizer's coronavirus vaccine in accordance with the positive recommendation of the European Medicines Agency (EMA).

History

Foundation (2008–2013) 
BioNTech was founded in 2008 based on research by Uğur Şahin, Özlem Türeci, and Christoph Huber, with a seed investment of €150 million from MIG Capital and AT Impf. The company's activities focus on the development and production of technologies and drugs for individualized cancer immunotherapy. Andreas and Thomas Strüngmann, Michael Motschmann, and Helmut Jeggle were cofounders. In 2009, the acquisition of EUFETS and JPT Peptide Technologies took place. Katalin Karikó, whose work on mRNA whilst working at the University of Pennsylvania underpinned the development of Pfizer–BioNTech COVID-19 vaccine, joined BioNTech as a senior vice president in 2013.

Expansion (2014–2019) 
Between 2014 and 2018, many research results on mRNA mechanisms were published by BioNTech. Collaborations and commercialization programs were concluded with various companies and scientific institutions starting in 2015. During this period, BioNTech filed several patent applications and developed a multi-layered strategy to protect its intellectual property in the various technology platforms and their application in the treatment of cancer and other serious diseases.

In August 2018, the company entered into a multi-year research and development (R&D) collaboration with the US company Pfizer, Inc. to develop mRNA-based vaccines for prevention of influenza. Under the terms of the agreement, following BioNTech's completion of a first-in-human clinical study, Pfizer would assume sole responsibility for further clinical development and commercialization of mRNA-based flu vaccines.

In January 2019, Sanofi invested  million in BioNTech and extended the mRNA cancer research collaboration between the two companies; Sanofi previously paid  million upfront for the rights to five discovery-stage immunotherapies of BioNTech in 2015. In July 2019, Fidelity Management & Research Company led a Series B investment round totalling $325 million, with additional investments from Redmile Group, Invus, Mirae Asset Financial Group, Platinum Asset Management, Jebsen Capital, Steam Athena Capital, BioVeda China Fund and the Struengmann Family Office. In September 2019, BioNTech received a capital contribution of  million from the Bill & Melinda Gates Foundation, with the option of doubling that investment amount at a later date.

Nasdaq IPO (2019) to COVID-19 
Since 10 October 2019, BioNTech, with its newly founded North American headquarters in Cambridge, Massachusetts, has been publicly traded as American Depository Shares (ADS) on the NASDAQ Global Select Market under the ticker symbol, BNTX. BioNTech was able to generate total gross proceeds of 150 million dollars from the IPO.

In 2021, BioNTech announced it would open its Asia headquarters in Singapore, and also open a vaccine manufacturing plant there, with support from the Singapore Economic Development Board. The Singapore factory is expected to be operational by 2023 and produce hundreds of millions of doses of mRNA vaccines per year. A collaboration with Fosun Pharma is planned to add a facility in China to produce a billion doses per year for China, Macau, Hong Kong, and Taiwan, though as of August 2021, the PRC had not approved any foreign-developed COVID-19 vaccines.

Corporate affairs

Locations 

BioNTech's founding place and global headquarters is Mainz, Germany, where the COVID-19 vaccine was created. The company runs multiple sites in the country.
Further research locations are in San Diego and Cambridge, Massachusetts, the latter of which also serves as the North American headquarters.
Additionally the company owns GMP-certified production facilities in Idar-Oberstein, Martinsried, Neuried, Bavaria, and Berlin. In November 2020, the company acquired facilities from Novartis in Marburg to ramp up its vaccine production.

Financing 
In December 2019, BioNTech received a €50 million loan, to finance the development of its patient-specific immunotherapies for the treatment of cancer and other serious diseases, from the European Investment Bank (EIB) as part of the European Commission Investment Plan for Europe.

The EIB then signed a €100 million loan in June 2020, after an accelerated approval (two months for a process that usually takes more than a year). This financing helped BioNTech's vaccine trials and manufacturing. The EIB loan is part of the InnovFin Corporate Research Equity programme and the European Fund for Strategic Investments. This programme supports "innovative and higher-risk projects" backed by the European Investment Bank with a guarantee from the European Union budget. In 17 March 2020, BioNTech received a $135 million investment from Fosun Pharma in exchange for 1.58 million shares in BioNTech and the future development and marketing rights of the mRNA vaccine BNT162b2 in China. In June 2020, BioNTech received €250 million from Temasek Holdings (Singapore) via the purchase of ordinary shares and 4 years convertible notes, but also from other investors through a private placement of mandatory convertible bonds. On 15 September 2020, the German Federal Ministry of Education and Research (BMBF) awarded a €375 million grant to BioNTech, to accelerate the development of the COVID-19 vaccine.

Business activities

Vaccine development 

"Project Lightspeed", the project to develop a novel mRNA technology for a COVID-19 vaccine, began in mid-January 2020 just days after the SARS-Cov-2 genetic sequence was first made public. The company is partnered on this project with Pfizer and Fosun.

The production of the vaccine was followed by clinical trials, the success of which was a prerequisite for the commencement of marketing. On 9 November 2020, BioNTech and Pfizer announced that 43,500 people in 6 countries had received a test vaccine against COVID-19 with more than 90 percent effectiveness. On the basis of successful testing, they asked for the right to distribute vaccines in the United States, as well as in the European Union, the United Kingdom and Japan.

Vaccine distribution timeline 
In July 2020, BioNTech and pharmaceutical corporation Pfizer signed contracts to supply 120 million doses for Japan, 100 million doses for the United States at $19.50, and 40 million doses for the United Kingdom, if proven effective, safe, and licensed. On 5 August 2020, Canada pre-ordered 20 million doses of the vaccine. In September 2020, Germany privately ordered 30 million doses, outside the collective EU purchasing scheme. On 5 November 2020, Australia pre-ordered 10 million doses. On 9 November 2020, BioNTech-Pfizer released a positive interim analysis of a Phase III clinical trial in the United States. On 10 November 2020, BioNTech and Pfizer applied for an emergency use authorization (EUA) with the FDA, which was reviewed by mid-December. The FDA released a document explaining that an EUA is "a mechanism to facilitate the availability and use of medical countermeasures, including vaccines, during public health emergencies, such as the current COVID-19 pandemic." On 11 November 2020, the European Union pre-ordered 300 million doses, at an initial price of €12 per dose. Under the agreement, the vaccine-producing pair, BioNTech and Pfizer are subject to a tightened legal obligation to bring all the experience they have gained to the EMA for review. Belgium's budget state secretary Eva De Bleeker accidentally revealed the vaccine purchase price-per-dose agreed by the EU with various companies, with Oxford-AstraZeneca at €1.78; Johnson & Johnson at $8.50, Sanofi-GSK at €7.56, CureVac at €10, and Moderna at $18. In the same month, Israel ordered 8 million doses at $23.50 a dose. In the same month BioNTech-Pfizer submitted an EUA application in Canada. On 2 December 2020, the United Kingdom granted conditional temporary authorization (under Regulation 174 of the Human Medicines Regulations 2012) for BNT162b2, becoming the first country to approve an mRNA vaccine and the first Western country to approve a COVID-19 vaccine for national use. In the same month, BNT162b2 was revealed to also be under evaluation for EUA status in several other countries. On 15 December 2020, Fosun Pharma agreed a deal to deliver 100 million doses of the BioNTech-Pfizer vaccine to China, with Hong Kong securing 7.5 million doses. On 21 December 2020, the European Medicines Agency (EMA) authorised a one-year conditional use of the BioNTech-Pfizer vaccine in the European Union. Emer Cooke, Director of the EMA, stated that the benefits of the vaccine far outweigh the potential risks. On 26 December 2020, following the authorisation, initial mass vaccination against coronavirus commenced in Hungary and Slovakia.

On 8 January 2021, the European Union ordered an additional 200 million doses of the vaccine, with an option for 100 million more. On 25 June 2021, the US Food and Drug Administration (FDA) added a warning about the risk of rare heart inflammation (myocarditis) to the specifications of both Pfizer/BioNTech and Moderna vaccines. As of that date, there were already 138 million US citizens who had been vaccinated twice with one of the mRNA-based vaccines, according to the US Centers for Disease Control and Prevention (CDC).

Cancer immunotherapy
In early 2023 BioNTech started a series of clinical trials in the United Kingdom for mRNA based immunotherapies targeting several types of cancer.

Sponsorship 
BioNTech, together with Pfizer, co-sponsored the Academy Awards ceremony in March 2022 as main sponsors.

In the sponsorship, the pharmaceutical duo stated that the widespread use of their vaccines and booster shots has helped prevent Covid19 diseases and protect lives, and the film industry has partnered to promote vaccines, mask use and other prevention strategies. BioNTech's spectacular marketing promotional success in the 2022 Oscars' sponsorship was its ability to appear ahead of its huge pharma partner Pfizer in the promotional duo's ubiquitous roster. This was a significant achievement because by this time 'BioNTech' had been removed from the name of the vaccine in almost every language in the world, and their joint product was mostly referred to simply as 'Pfizer'.

See also 
 BBV152
 CureVac
 Moderna COVID-19 vaccine
 Novavax COVID-19 vaccine
 Oxford–AstraZeneca COVID-19 vaccine
 Sputnik V COVID-19 vaccine
 V451 vaccine

References

External links 

 
 

2019 initial public offerings
 
Biotechnology companies established in 2008
Biotechnology companies of Germany
Companies based in Mainz
Companies listed on the Nasdaq
German companies established in 2008
Medical research
COVID-19 vaccine producers